Aethes patricia is a species of moth of the family Tortricidae. It was described by Metzler in 1999. It is found in the United States, where it has been recorded from Indiana, Michigan and Ohio.

References

patricia
Moths described in 2000
Moths of North America